James Hamilton McLean (17 June 1936 - 11 November 2016) was an American malacologist (a biologist who studies mollusks). He specialized in marine gastropods. He worked on many families of Eastern Pacific gastropods including the Fissurellidae, Trochidae, Turbinidae and Liotiidae, and also investigated deep sea gastropods from hydrothermal vents.

McLean worked as a curator of Natural History Museum of Los Angeles County from 1964 to 2001 and was a curator emeritus there until his death in November 2016.

Molluscs described 
McLean, often together with other malacologists, described, according to the database WoRMS, 385 new taxa.

At least 37 taxa were named for James McLean with the epithet macleani (according to WoRMS)

He named numerous taxa of marine gastropods including:
 Clypeosectidae McLean, 1989, a family of hydrothermal vent limpets

Bibliography 
 Handbook, 1969, revised in 1978, Marine Shells of Southern California
 Geiger D. L. & McLean J. H. (10 February 2010) "New species and records of Scissurellidae and Anatomidae from the Americas (Mollusca: Gastropoda: Vetigastropoda)". Zootaxa 2356: 1-35, 24 plates. preview.

References

 Note: the NHM info is still available here

Further reading
 DuShane H. (1967). "Biographical sketch. James H. McLean". News of the Western Association of Shell Clubs 8(5): C15.
 McLean J. H. (1998). "Up close and personal with AMU’s presidents". American Malacological Union News 27(2): 4.
 Groves L. (2001). "Jim McLean retires". Unitas Malacologica Newsletter 17: 4.

External links
 Lindsey T. Groves, Daniel L. Geiger, Jann E. Vendetti, Egene V. Coan  Biography: James Hamilton McLean: The master of the Gastropoda; Zoosymposia, vol. 13, 2019

1936 births
Living people
American malacologists